This is a list of bridges and tunnels on the National Register of Historic Places in the U.S. territory of Puerto Rico.

References 

+Puerto Rico
Bridges